The 2002–03 Russian Superleague season was the seventh season of the Russian Superleague, the top level of ice hockey in Russia. 18 teams participated in the league, and Lokomotiv Yaroslavl won the championship for the second season in a row.

Regular season

Playoffs

3rd place: HC Lada Togliatti – Avangard Omsk 2:0 (4:1, 4:1)

External links
Season on hockeyarchives.ru

Russian Superleague seasons
1